Crataegus okanaganensis is a species of hawthorn native to western British Columbia, Washington state and Montana. It forms a vigorous shrub to 8 m in height with brilliant red fruit in late summer, that later ripen to "burgundy to deep purple (occasionally almost black)". It has potential as an ornamental plant.

References

okanaganensis
Flora of North America